The San Francisco Symphony Chorus is the resident chorus of the San Francisco Symphony (SFS).

Background
Established in 1972 at the request of then-music director Seiji Ozawa, the chorus first performed in the 1973-74 Symphony season. The SFS Chorus today has 156 members and gives a minimum of 26 performances each season at Davies Symphony Hall. They have performed with some of the world's greatest conductors such as Michael Tilson Thomas, Kurt Masur, Neville Marriner, Roger Norrington, and many others.

Leadership
During its first decade, Louis Magor served as the SFS Chorus director. Magor was succeeded in 1982 by the director of the Chicago Symphony Chorus, Margaret Hillis.  In 1983, Hillis was succeeded by Vance George who served as chorus director for twenty-three years until his retirement in 2006. The current director is Ragnar Bohlin, who came to the SFS Chorus from Stockholm, Sweden where he was awarded with the prestigious Johannes Norrby medallion in 2006, for expanding the horizon of the Swedish choral community.

Awards
Emmy Award, Outstanding Classical Music-Dance Program
 2001 Sondheim: Sweeney Todd In Concert, filmed for PBS
Grammy Award for Best Classical Album 
 2000 Stravinsky: Perséphone
 2004 Mahler: Symphony No. 3
 2010 Mahler: Symphony No. 8
Grammy Award for Best Choral Performance
 1992 Orff: Carmina Burana
 1995 Brahms: Ein deutsches Requiem
 2010 Mahler: Symphony No. 8

Grammy Award for Best Engineered Album, Classical
 2010 Mahler: Symphony No. 8

See also
 American Guild of Musical Artists
 San Francisco Opera

References

External links
San Francisco Symphony Chorus

San Francisco Symphony
Grammy Award winners
Musical groups established in 1972
Musical groups from San Francisco
Choirs in the San Francisco Bay Area
1972 establishments in California